Düppel can refer to:

 The German name for Dybbøl, a town in Denmark famed for an 1864 battle
 Düppel (Berlin), a forest and neighbourhood in Berlin, Germany
 Chaff (radar countermeasure)